The Fauna of Nepal includes 3.96% of mammals, 3.72% of butterflies and 8.9% of birds among the total number of species found in the world. The protected species in Nepal include 26 mammals, nine birds and three reptiles. The endemic fauna are: Himalayan field mouse, Spiny babbler, Nepali kalij, 14 herpetofauna, and six types of fishes.

Taxonomic lists and indices

Vertebrates
 Birds of Nepal
 Mammals of Nepal
 Reptiles of Nepal
 Amphibians of Nepal

Invertebrates
Butterflies of Nepal
List of moths of Nepal (Bombycidae)
List of moths of Nepal (Brahmaeidae)
List of moths of Nepal (Drepanidae)
List of moths of Nepal (Eupterotidae)
List of moths of Nepal (Lasiocampidae)
List of moths of Nepal (Limacodidae)
List of moths of Nepal (Saturniidae)
List of moths of Nepal (Sphingidae)
List of moths of Nepal (Uraniidae)
List of moths of Nepal (Zygaenidae)
List of beetles of Nepal (Carabidae: Paussinae)
List of beetles of Nepal (Cerambycidae)
List of beetles of Nepal (Coccinellidae)
List of bugs of Nepal (Scutelleridae)
List of Odonata of Nepal
 Non-marine molluscs of Nepal

See also
 Flora of Nepal
 Wildlife of Nepal

References

External links

WILDLIFE by Nepal Tourism Board